Phenacolimax major is a European species of small air-breathing land snail, a terrestrial pulmonate gastropod mollusk in the family Vitrinidae.

Distribution
This species is known to occur in a number of Western European countries and islands including:
 Great Britain
 Switzerland
 Germany
 and other areas

References
 AnimalBase info at: 

Phenacolimax
Gastropods described in 1807